Sport Clube Alba (aka Alba) is a Portuguese football team founded on 1 January 1941, located in Albergaria-a-Velha, district of Aveiro, and currently competing in the Terceira Divisão - Serie C. Sport Clube Alba won the Aveiro Football Association (AFA) Secondary Championship in 1961-1962, moving up to the Distrial 1st Division. The team hosts games at the Estádio Martins Pereira.

History

Sport Clube Alba is a Portuguese sports club founded on 1 January 1941.

The club was the winner of the AFA Secondary Championship (football) in 1961–62, going up to the Distrital 1st Division. In the 1964–5 season it competed in the fourth series of the 3rd Division championship that was won by Águeda. In 1968/69 it won the distrital championship of the 1st division of Aveiro.

In the 1970s it competed 5 times (1971–72, 1974–75, 1975–76, 1976–77 and 1978–79) in the old Portuguese 2nd Division.

Stadium

Estádio Municipal Doutor Mário Martins Pereira.

Season to season

Honours
 Campeão 1ª Distrital de Aveiro:
 1968/69
 Campeão 1ª Distrital de Aveiro; Supertaça distrital (District Supercup):
 2009/10
 Campeão 2ª Distrital Associação de Futebol de Aveiro:
 1961/62

Presidents

 Augusto Martins Pereira (1941–59)
 António Augusto Martins Pereira (1959–76)
 Lutero Letra da Costa (1976–80, 1st term)
 Mário Vidal da Silva (1980–81)
 António Rodrigues Parente (1981–84)
 João António Ferreira Resende Alves (1984–87)
 Rui Arvins Pereira Pinto (1987–89)
 Lutero Letra da Costa (1991–92, 2nd term)
 Fernando Pereira Pinto (1992–95)
 Manuel Conceição Neves (1995–2001)
 Abílio Costa (2001–07)
 Conceição Araújo (unknown)
 Carlos Coelho (since 2007)
 João Alves (aka "luvas pretas"), was born in Albergaria-a-Velha, on 5 December of 195. He was one of the most famous football players of his generation. He was also one of the presidents of the club during the 90s.

Managers

 Couceiro Figueira
 Carlos Alves (coach)
 Valongo (Joaquim Freire)
 Virgílio Pereira
 Augusto Semedo
 Joaquim Queirós
 Quitó (Joaquim António Sousa)
 Óscar Mendes

References

External links
 Official website 
 Alba at Zero Zero
 Alba at foradejogo.net  
 Former Page
 SC Alba blog  

Football clubs in Portugal
Sport in Albergaria-a-Velha
Association football clubs established in 1941
1941 establishments in Portugal